Samson vs. the Giant King (also known as Giant of the Lost Tomb and Atlas Against the Czar) is a 1964 Italian fantasy-peplum film directed by Amerigo Anton.

The czar Nicolas sends a secret mission of experts to find a hidden treasure. However, he also he prepares a group of mercenaries who should kill the members of the mission after their return.

Cast 

Kirk Morris: Maciste
Massimo Serato: Czar Nicola
Ombretta Colli: Sonia
Gloria Milland: Nadia
Giulio Donnini: Igor
Tom Felleghy: Akim (as Tom Felleghi) 
Dada Gallotti: Katia 
Attilio Dottesio

References

External links

 
1964 films
Films directed by Tanio Boccia
Films scored by Carlo Rustichelli
Peplum films
1964 adventure films
Maciste films
Films set in Russia
Sword and sandal films
1960s Italian-language films
1960s Italian films